Cedar Creek Township is a civil township of Muskegon County in the U.S. state of Michigan. The population was 3,109 in the 2000 census.

Geography
According to the United States Census Bureau, the township has a total area of 36.2 square miles (93.8 km2), of which 35.2 square miles (91.2 km2) is land and 1.0 square mile (2.6 km2) (2.82%) is water.

Demographics
As of the census of 2000, there were 3,109 people, 1,180 households, and 857 families residing in the township. The racial makeup of the township was 95.30% White, 1.22% African American, 0.93% Native American, 0.16% Asian, 0.74% from other races, and 1.64% from two or more races. Hispanic or Latino of any race were 2.06% of the population.

There were 1,180 households, out of which 35.3% had children under the age of 18 living with them, 54.1% were married couples living together, 13.1% had a female householder with no husband present, and 27.3% were non-families. 20.3% of all households were made up of individuals, and 5.6% had someone living alone who was 65 years of age or older.  The average household size was 2.63 and the average family size was 3.02.

In the township the population was spread out, with 27.7% under the age of 18, 9.1% from 18 to 24, 30.7% from 25 to 44, 24.1% from 45 to 64, and 8.5% who were 65 years of age or older.  The median age was 35 years. For every 100 females, there were 102.0 males.  For every 100 females age 18 and over, there were 98.1 males.

The median income for a household in the township was $36,179, and the median income for a family was $41,944. Males had a median income of $35,504 versus $26,636 for females. The per capita income for the township was $16,775.  About 10.5% of families and 10.6% of the population were below the poverty line, including 13.9% of those under age 18 and none of those age 65 or over.

References 

Townships in Muskegon County, Michigan
Townships in Michigan